Nijkamp is a surname. Notable people with the surname include:

Gerard Nijkamp (born 1970), Dutch soccer player and manager
Heleen Nijkamp (married Mees, born 1968), Dutch opinion writer, economist and lawyer
Jan-Dirk Nijkamp (born 1964), Dutch sprint canoer
Marieke Nijkamp (born 1986),  Dutch novelists
Peter Nijkamp (born 1946), Dutch economist, Professor of Regional Economics and Economic Geography
Rose Marie Nijkamp (born 2006), Dutch tennis player